Foxen is a surname. Notable people with the surname include:

Alex Foxen (born 1991), American poker player
Bill Foxen (1879–1937), American baseball pitcher
James Foxen ( 1769–1829), English hangman

Patronymic surnames
English-language surnames